Albion is a ghost town in Harper County, Kansas, United States.

History
Albion was laid out in 1882. A post office called Albion was in operation from 1883 until 1902.

References

Geography of Harper County, Kansas
Ghost towns in Kansas